Acrobatic gymnastics is a competitive discipline of gymnastics where partnerships of gymnasts work together and perform figures consisting of acrobatic moves, dance and tumbling, set to music. There are three types of routines; a 'balance' routine (at FIG grade 5 and above) where the focus is on strength, poise and flexibility; a 'dynamic' routine (also FIG grade 5 and above) which includes throws, somersaults and catches, and (at FIG grade 6 and above, as well as grade 4 and below) a 'combined' routine which includes elements from both balance and dynamic.

The sport is governed by the International Federation of Gymnastics (FIG, an abbreviation of Fédération Internationale de Gymnastique). At international level, there are four FIG categories of competition defined by age; 11–16, 12–18, 13–19, and 15+ (Senior). There are also grades 1–6, with grade 5 being the same difficulty as 11–16 and grade 6 being the same difficulty as 12–18.

Acrobatic gymnasts perform in pairs or groups and enter into and are judged at a specific level or age group category. In each partnership, the gymnasts' different sizes and abilities will be balanced to complement each other in order to carry out the complex moves. Some will mainly carry out supporting and pitching roles, and are known as bases. They are then balanced with usually smaller gymnasts who become the 'tops'. In men's and women's groups there are also one or two 'middles', who are like another base who usually will support the top while balancing on the base. The different partnerships seen in competition are:
 women's pair (two females)
 men's pair (two males)
 mixed pair (a male base and a female top)
 women's group (three females)
 men's group (four males)

As well as this, in grades 1–2 there can be mixed groups (either 3 or 4 people from both genders). In competition, partnerships perform a routine to music, that has usually been choreographed specifically for them. The gymnasts carry out their acrobatic moves and combine them with dance, all in time to and in keeping with the style of the music. Partnerships are judged on  artistry/dance (worth 10.0 points out of 31.5) execution of skills (marked out of 10 and doubled to give 20.0 points out of 31.5) and difficulty of skill (worth 1.5 out of 31.5).

The rules for the sport, known as the Code of Points, are governed by the FIG. These rules are subject to change every four years in line with the Olympic cycle, as in other disciplines of gymnastics.

Competitions 
Acrobatic Gymnastics is part of the World Games, and are also included in the European Games as well as having a dedicated Acrobatic Gymnastics World Championships held in even numbered years (known as World Sports Acrobatics Championships prior to 2006), and continental or region championships in odd numbered years. For example, the 28th Acrobatic Gymnastics European Championships were held in Rzeszow, Poland in October 2017.

There are also numerous national, state, and regional competitions that are held in each country. Local and regional competitions often form the qualification stages required to compete at national championships. There is no requirement from the FIG for gymnasts to have qualified through their own national championships to compete internationally, but local governing bodies will often make their national team selections based on performance at national competition.

Acrobatic gymnastics events often attract sizable audiences, because they are entertaining, exhilarating, and suspenseful due to perceived risky or daring moves. At the London 2012 Olympics, acrobatic partnerships were seen performing before the Olympic gymnastic events, and during the opening and closing ceremonies. It has been said that its appearance, despite not being an Olympic discipline, is testament to its ability to entertain.

Gold, silver, and bronze medals are generally awarded in the usual fashion; although in some competitions, a minimum score is required to qualify for medals.

Routines 
The number of required routines at a competition depends on the level at which the gymnasts are competing. At the junior and senior levels, all three routines mentioned below are required. At lower age levels, only a single simpler routine is required. Each of the routine types has a different emphasis, but all include tumbling and dance as elements. The different routine types are as follows:

 Balance (formerly known as Static) – A balance routine requires that certain poses or 'balances' and must be held static for a specific duration. These moves require strength, poise, elegance and flexibility. Gymnasts will combine into towers, or pyramids with the tops holding a particular position balanced on their bases. Traditionally, balance routines were often performed to slower music, but not exclusively so. Balance routines last approximately two minutes and forty seconds.
 Dynamic (formerly known as Tempo) – These routines demonstrate power, strength and grace through the performance of acrobatic moves that involve the phases of spring, flight, rotation, and landing. This often involves the base, or bases in the partnership propelling the top through the air and through a series of somersaults or twists. The top is generally caught, or supported in the landing by their base(s). Dynamic routines last approximately two minutes.
 Combined – At the more senior levels of competition (12–18 through senior levels), a third routine must be performed that combines both balance and dynamic moves, along with the usual tumbling and dance (tumbling is not required from senior level athletes). Typically it is performed as a finals routine, with a duration, depending upon the level of competition, of approximately 2 minutes and 30 seconds.

Scoring 

The acrobatic gymnastics competitions are judged on a score out of 30.00. The following are the categories in which the athletes are scored.
 an artistic component which evaluates the acrobats performance in terms of choreography, diversity, and ability to perform to the music; (scored out of 10)
 an execution component which evaluates the deductions incurred by the acrobats while performing the partner and individual skills of the routine (for example, bent legs or unpointed toes). This is scored out of 10, but then later doubled to emphasize its importance.
 a difficulty component which is the overall equivalent score based on the degree of difficulty and number of skills (the difficulty score is determined by the value allocated to skills according to the Code of Points).

Scores over thirty are not uncommon, as difficulty points are not limited.

Judging 

The judging panels of acrobatic gymnastics are similar to other disciplines of gymnastics where different panels of judges are overseen by a head judge, and each panel has a 'Chair of the Judging Panel' (CJP) who oversees that panel's activities. In acrobatic gymnastics, there are then difficulty judges (DJ) who only assess the difficulty of the elements in the routines; artistic judges (AJ) who only assess the performance and artistic merits of the routine; and execution judges (EJ) who only judge what points should be deducted based on imperfect execution of individual elements in the routine. The numbers of each type of judge on an acrobatic panel depends on the level of the competition and can vary from one to many (with the exception of the Chair, as there is only one CJP per panel).

History 
The first use of acrobatics as a specific sport was in the Soviet Union in the 1930s, and the first world championships were in 1974.

In addition to the current five categories, two additional categories for tumbling (men's and women's) were included until the 1999 World Championships, though some groups still involve tumbling events.

In the United States, the first national sports acrobatics organization was called the United States Sports Acrobatics Federation (USSAF). Founded in 1975, its name was changed to the United States Sports Acrobatics (USSA) in the 1990s. The USSA then merged with USA Gymnastics in 2002, and Acrobatic Gymnastics is now a discipline therein.

See also 
 Acrobalance
 Acrobatics
 Acroyoga
 Aerobic gymnastics
 Castell
 Human pyramid
 Human tower (gymnastic formation)

References

External links

 Acrobatics on the FIG website
 Acrobatic Gymnastics on USAG website 
 Acrobatic Gymnastics on the British Gymnastics website
 Club Flic Flac Spanish Team
 Gymnastics on the Japan Acrobatic Gymnastics Association website

 
Gymnastics
Women's sports
History of women's sports